The King and Mrs Candle is a 1955 American TV play. It was directed by Arthur Penn and written by Sumner Locke Elliott. It was an original musical for TV.

Premise
A European monarch comes to America.

Cast
Cyril Ritchard
Joan Greenwood
Irene Manning
Richard Haydn

Reception
The New York Times called it "relaxing and enjoyable television".

References

External links
The King and Mrs Candle at IMDb

1955 television plays